"Heart Failed (In The Back Of A Taxi)" (also referred simply as "Heart Failed") is a single by the pop band Saint Etienne. It was released as the second single from the album Sound of Water. It was on the UK Singles Chart for two weeks, peaking at No. 50 on 24 June 2000. The single included two new B-sides, "Thank You" and the instrumental "Bar Conscience", and remixes by Two Lone Swordsmen and Futureshock.

The song has been included on many compilations since its release, including Travel Edition 1990-2005 and London Conversations.

The single's music video was directed my Mikey Torkins and featured singer Sarah Cracknell driving at night and some pictures of an airport.

Track listing 

All songs written by Sarah Cracknell, Bob Stanley and Pete Wiggs.

References 

Saint Etienne (band) songs
2000 singles
Songs written by Bob Stanley (musician)
Songs written by Pete Wiggs
Songs written by Sarah Cracknell
2000 songs
Heavenly Recordings singles